This is a list of Imperial College London people, including notable students and staff from the various historical institutions which are now part of Imperial College. 
Students who later became academics at Imperial are listed in the alumni section only to avoid duplication.

Science and engineering

Chemists

Engineers

Mathematicians and statisticians

Medicine

Physicists

Law and politics

Dato Amin Liew (Bruneian Cabinet Minister)

Business

Literature

Andrew Crumey (novelist)
David Irving (author)
Simon Singh (popular science author)
H. G. Wells (science fiction author)

Others

Staff

Chemists

Engineers

Mathematicians and statisticians

Physicists

See also 
 President and Rector of Imperial College London
 List of Nobel laureates affiliated with Imperial College London
 List of Fellows of Imperial College London

References

External links 
Imperial College student lists

Imperial College London